Brampton Ash is a civil parish and village in Northamptonshire, England. It lies in the extreme north-west of Northamptonshire and the nearest urban settlements are the nearby towns of Corby, Kettering, Desborough and Market Harborough. Running past the north of the village is the A427 road which connects Market Harborough to Oundle. At the 2011 census the population of the village was included in the civil parish of Stoke Albany.

The villages name means 'Broom farm/settlement' with abundant 'Ash-trees'.

Within Brampton Ash are the remains of a stone quarry. The church of St. Mary the Virgin is the main feature of the village. It is floodlit at night and can be seen for miles around the Welland valley. Brampton Ash is in North Northamptonshire but before local government changes in 2021 was in the Borough of Kettering.

Population

References

External links

Villages in Northamptonshire
North Northamptonshire
Civil parishes in Northamptonshire